Basílio Farinha is a Portuguese politician. He was born July 31, 1977, in Portalegre Hospital, and lived in the parish of Chancelaria in Alter do Chão.

Until the 4th grade, he attended Primary School No. 1 in Chança, and continued through 9th grade at Primary School Nos. 2 and 3 in the Alter do Chão municipal seat. He pursued secondary studies in a Technical Education in Sports program at Mousinho da Silveira Secondary School in Portalegre.

In 1997 he carried out his obligatory military service in Infantry Regiment No. 3 in Beja, after which he was transferred to the headquarters of the Évora Military Region, where he performed "funções de praça", responsible for all military physical education in the southern zone.

He joined the CDS-PP CDS-PP on April 23, 2001, becoming president of the party political council of CDS em Alter do Chão on April 23, 2008. Before this date the council had 30 members and two months later the number rose to 70.

In September 2008, he was invited by the vice president of the District of the CDS-PP in Portalegre.

On January 17, 2009, in Caldas da Rainha, he was elected to the 23rd congress of the CDS-PP, in direct elections, national advisor to the party president, Paulo Portas.

On April 19, 2009, he was again elected in direct elections as Vogal da Direcção do CDS-PP Madeira.

He was campaign director for the European elections in the district of Portalegre on July 16, 2009. He collaborated intensively in the legislative elections of September 27, 2009 and was director of the local elections of October 11 in Alter do Chão.

A man very close to the party president, Dr. Paulo Portas, and to the president of the parliamentary group of the CDS-PP, Dr. Pedro Mota Soares. Paulo Portas even came to be the Mandatário Politico of the 2009 local elections in Alter do Chão, where Ribeiro e Castro was also present during the campaign.

Currently resides in Madeira, where he is member of the board of the CDS-PP Madeira island, vice-president of the County of Santa Cruz, a member of the permanent office of implementation of the CDS-PP Madeira also part of the organizing group of the regional elections of 2011.

Professionally is legally responsible for a private security company and carries out such activity "maximum security " in the Madeira Free Zone the 2009 at 2013.

Basilio Farinha from 2009 to 2018 Directed Strong Private Security Company and internal trainer.
External trainer of Empresa Espirito da Sabedoria and the company Proteforma.

Academically Basílio Farinha:
Degree in Security Studies from Lusofona University;
Post-graduation in Security Management by Universidade Aberta;
Post-graduation in Internal Security by Cognos;
Military Auditor for the National Defense Institution;
Course of General Course of Security of Classified Information, and Training module in Industrial Security by the Presidency of the Council of Ministers - National Security Office
Psychosocial Psychology in Situations of Catastrophes Crisis and Emergencies by the school Superpe of Education of Portalagre;
Safety Auditor at work by Cognos;
Officer for Port Facility Protection by certitecna

References

Living people
CDS – People's Party politicians
1977 births
People from Portalegre District